Welcome Ncita (born 21 October 1965) is a retired professional boxer and former IBF Super Bantamweight Champion.

Known as "The Hawk", Ncita turned professional in 1984 and in 1990 captured the International Boxing Federation Super Bantamweight Title with a victory over Fabrice Benichou in a bout that took place in Tel Aviv.  Ncita defended the title six times before losing it to Kennedy McKinney in 1992.  He lost a rematch by decision to McKinney in 1994, a fight in which McKinney was knocked down in round five, but Ncita's left eye swelled shut midway through the bout.  Ncita retired in 1998. Welcome therefore had settled with his wife Noletu Ncita who is a Master Practitioner in Real Estate(MPRE) and the owner of Noletu Ncita Properties which had recently started in January 2023. Welcome and Noletu have an elder son Ray ncita and three daughters, Brewell Ncita, Latoya Ncita and Buhle Ncita.

References

External links
  retrieved 19th Dec 2010

1965 births
Living people
People from Mdantsane
Bantamweight boxers
International Boxing Federation champions
South African male boxers
Sportspeople from the Eastern Cape